Serravalle is a village in Tuscany, central Italy, administratively a frazione of the comune of Buonconvento, province of Siena. At the time of the 2001 census its population was 18.

Serravalle is about 24 km from Siena and 4 km from Buonconvento.

References 

Frazioni of Buonconvento